The 2018–19 Rider Broncs men's basketball team represented Rider University in the 2018–19 NCAA Division I men's basketball season. They played their home games at the Alumni Gymnasium in Lawrenceville, New Jersey as members of the Metro Atlantic Athletic Conference, and were led by seventh year head coach Kevin Baggett. They finished the 2018–19 season 16–15 overall, 11–7 in MAAC play to finish in a four-way tie for second place. As the 4th seed in the 2019 MAAC tournament, they were defeated by No. 5 seed Siena 81–87 in the quarterfinals.

Previous season
The Broncs finished the 2017–18 season 22–10, 15–3 in MAAC play to finish in a tie for first place with Canisius. After tie breakers, they were the No. 1 seed in the MAAC tournament where they were upset in the quarterfinals by Saint Peter's. As a regular season conference champion, and No. 1 seed in their conference tournament, who failed to win their conference tournament, they received an automatic bid to the National Invitation Tournament where they lost in the first round to Oregon.

Roster

Schedule and results

|-
!colspan=12 style=| Exhibition

|-
!colspan=12 style=| Non-Conference Regular season

|-
!colspan=9 style=| MAAC regular season

|-
!colspan=12 style=| MAAC tournament
|-

|-

Source

References

Rider Broncs men's basketball seasons
Rider Broncs
Rider Broncs men's basketball team
Rider Broncs men's basketball team